Vladimir Petrovich Yevtushenkov (born 25 September 1948) is a Russian billionaire business oligarch. He is the majority owner (49.2%) and former сhairman of Sistema. As a member of the Russian-Saudi Economic Council and as chairman since 2002 of both the Russian side of the Russian-Saudi and Russian-Arab Business Councils which are part of the Chamber of Commerce and Industry (CCI), he maintains very close ties to both Saudi Arabia and the Arab world. He is allegedly close to Serhiy Taruta, Viktor Yanukovych and Mykola Bilokon.

Early life
Yevtushenkov has master's degrees in chemistry (1973, from D. Mendeleev Moscow Chemical Engineering Institute) and economics (1980), and a PhD in economics (1986). Yevtushenkov worked as an engineer at Karacharovo Plastics Works until 1982, and as chief engineer and first deputy general director of the Polymerbyt Scientific and Production Association until 1987, when he was appointed as the head of the Department of Science and Technology for the Moscow city government.

One year after Yuri Luzhkov became mayor of Moscow, Yevtushenkov resigned from the Moscow city government in 1993 to establish Sistema from his small city department known as the Moscow Committee on Science and Technology.

Career
The first firm he gained control was Moscow City Telephone Network (MGTS) purchasing a 55% stake in MGTS during privatization. In 1993, he gained control of the Moscow Bank for Reconstruction and Development that became a designated bank for the Government of Moscow which greatly increased cash flows through the bank and, in February 2018, MTS Bank became the sole operator for five years on the Mayor of Moscow's website mos.ru. Нe is the major shareholder and since 1995 was chairman of the board of the Russian investment holding company Sistema (together with another Top Managers such as Evgeny Novitsky). In April 2022, Yevtushenkov reduced his stake in Sistema below control (49.2%) and stepped down from the Corporation’s board of directors. Sistema was an early shareholder in Russian mobile telecommunications pioneer VimpelCom, and sold its stake when the company was the first Russian company to list on the New York Stock Exchange in November 1996. Yevtushenkov took Sistema public in February 2005, in a $1.35 billion IPO that was Russia's largest ever at the time. Today Sistema is the largest shareholder in MTS (49.94%), Russia's largest telecommunications company. Other major Sistema assets include children's goods retailer Detsky Mir (until 2020), pulp and paper holding Segezha Group, Russia's largest chain of private healthcare clinics MEDSI, the largest stake in East-West United Bank (Luxembourg) (EWUB) which has become the principal Russian overseas bank in Europe after Gazprombank's liquidation and the sanctioning of the VTB network of banks, etc.

In 2009, Sistema purchased oil and gas companies in the Republic of Bashkortostan. This would be the foundation of the oil and gas company Bashneft.

Currently, Yevtushenkov owns 49.2% of the total conglomerate. In 2014, according to Forbes, he was Russia's 15th richest businessman with a fortune of around US$9 billion. On the Forbes 2016 list of the world's billionaires, he was ranked #722 with a net worth of US$2.4 billion. By February 2018 his assets had fallen to US$2 billion, and his rank plunged to #1215; by November 2018, Yevtushenkov was Russia's 62nd wealthiest man with his total means amounting US$1.4 billion and dropping to #1541 in the world's billionaires ranking.

Bashneft and house arrest; sanctions 
In September 2014, Russian investigators placed Yevtushenkov under house arrest, accusing him of money-laundering in connection with the acquisition of shares in oil producer Bashneft. 70% of Bashneft's shares were owned by Sistema. Sistema said it considered the accusations baseless. In December 2014, as ruled by the Moscow Arbitration (Commercial) Court, Bashneft was re-nationalised. Following the return of Bashneft to State ownership, in February 2015 the Moscow Arbitration Court awarded Yevtushenkov's Sistema RUB 70.7 billion ($1.1 billion) in damages from the loss of Bashneft. In January 2016, all the accusations against him in connection with the acquisition of Bashneft has been dismissed as it was found that no crime had been committed.

As of the end of March 2022, Yevtushenkov, Sistema and its subsidiary East-West United Bank (EWUB) in Luxembourg have not been under sanctions associated with the Russian interference in Ukraine, but on 7 April 2022 Yevtushenkov was included in the sanctions list of Australia.

The United Kingdom imposed sanctions in April 2022, freezing his assets in the UK as Yevtushenkov handed his son 10% of Sistema, reducing his personal holding to 49.2%.

On September 1, 2022, the High Anti-Corruption Court of Ukraine ruled to confiscate Yevtushenko's assets. These are 17 real estate objects with an area of more than 100 thousand square meters, as well as shares in Ukrainian enterprises.

Personal life
He and his wife Natalya Nikolayevna, have two children, and live in the Odintsovo city district of Moscow at Zhukovka.  He is Jewish.

Notes

References

External links
 Protesters outside Yevtushenkov's London house at 31 Holland Park, W11 demand sanctions

1948 births
Living people
Russian oligarchs
Russian mass media owners
Russian billionaires
D. Mendeleev University of Chemical Technology of Russia alumni
Sistema